Swedish Health Services, formerly Swedish Medical Center, is the largest nonprofit health provider in the Seattle metropolitan area. It operates five hospital campuses (in the Seattle neighborhoods of First Hill, Cherry Hill and Ballard, and the cities of Edmonds and Issaquah), ambulatory care centers in the cities of Redmond and Mill Creek, and Swedish Medical Group, a network of more than 100 primary-care and specialty clinics. It is affiliated with many other health care providers across Washington state, and had 8,886 employees and 6,023 credentialed physicians as of 2013.

History
Dr. Nils August Johanson founded Swedish Hospital in 1910 as Seattle's first modern nonprofit medical facility. Dr. Johanson was an immigrant from Sweden and was the father-in-law of Seattle businessman Elmer Nordstrom; the medical center's name pays tribute to Johanson's heritage. In 1932, Swedish opened the first cancer-care center west of the Mississippi. The board of trustees for Swedish Hospital were historically of Swedish descent until the election of two non-Swedish-American doctors in 1968.

Swedish originally started with its First Hill campus, but began to expand its network by merging with Seattle General Hospital (founded 1895) and the Doctors Hospital (founded 1944) in May, 1978. Swedish then expanded outside First Hill when it purchased Ballard Community Hospital in the Seattle district of Ballard (founded 1928) on July 1, 1992. The Ballard purchase was followed up with that of Providence Seattle Medical Center (founded 1876) in the Central District from Providence Health & Services in February 2000. After a decade, Swedish began expanding outside Seattle and King County with its lease of Stevens Hospital (founded January 26, 1964) Edmonds on September 1, 2010, and the opening of a brand-new campus in Issaquah in July, 2011.

In 2009, Swedish partnered with The Polyclinic to implement electronic health records, and in 2012 it became affiliated with Providence Health & Services. In 2014, Swedish formed new partnerships with Group Health Cooperative and Pacific Medical Centers.

COVID-19 pandemic
In 2020, the hospital administration threatened to fire a physician for wearing personal protective equipment outside a patient care area during the COVID-19 pandemic. The hospital has since backed down. It requires workers infected with coronavirus to exhaust sick and vacation time before granting them 80 hours of emergency time off.

Swedish Medical Center is one of only two hospitals in Washington that can perform extracorporeal membrane oxygenation, and so it accepted patients with the most extreme cases of COVID-19 during the pandemic. The hospital is performing clinical trials of Tocilizumab to counter  the effects of a cytokine storm, an extreme immune reaction that occurs in the most extreme cases of COVID-19.

Notable Staff
Since 2017, Dr. Guy Hudson has served as Swedish's chief executive officer.

References

Sources
Nordstrom, Katharine Johanson; Marshall, Margaret (2002) My Father's Legacy: The Story of Doctor Nils August Johanson, Founder of Swedish Medical (University of Washington Press)

External links

Hospital networks in the United States
Medical and health organizations based in Washington (state)
Swedish-American culture in Washington (state)
Hospitals established in 1910
1910 establishments in Washington (state)
Hospitals in Seattle
Trauma centers